Jean-Antoine de Mesmes, called d'Avaux (1640–1709), was a French diplomat in the service of Louis XIV. He is probably best known for accompanying King James II of England in his Irish expedition. He also negotiated for France the Peace of Nijmegen, which ended the Franco-Dutch War (1672–1678). He was French ambassador in Venice, The Hague, Stockholm and finally The Hague again.

Birth and origins 
Jean-Antoine was born in 1639 or 1640 He was the youngest of the four sons of Jean-Antoine de Mesmes and his wife Anne Courtin. His father was Comte d'Avaux and a president at the Parlement of Paris. His paternal uncle Claude was a well known diplomat. Jean-Antoine's mother was the daughter of François Courtin, seigneur de Brusselles and baron de Givry.

Jean-Antoine de Mesmes, the diplomat, the subject of this article, may easily be confused with other members of his family who shared the same name, notably his father Jean-Antoine de Mesmes, comte d'Avaux (died 1673) and his nephew Jean-Antoine de Mesmes (premier président), premier president of the Paris Parlement and comte d'Avaux (died 1723).

Comte d'Avaux 
Jean-Antoine de Mesmes, the diplomat, was never a count. That title passed from his father (died 1673) to his eldest brother, Jean-Jacques, who died in 1688, and then to Jean-Jacques's eldest son, who died in 1723 and outlived the diplomat (see family tree). However, he liked to pass himself off as "comte d'Avaux" when abroad on his embassies to better his precedence. Saint Simon remarks upon this habit in his memoirs. He appears as "comte d'Avaux" in many texts, among others his obituary in the Gazette de France, Louis Moréri's historical dictionary, and, besides, a modern academic study. He signed "De avaux". His eldest brother did not approve but may not have cared that much because he preferred his title of president over that of count.

Order of the Holy Spirit 
In 1684 he became Provost and Master of Ceremonies of the Order of the Holy Spirit, which is the highest order of chivalry in France. However, membership and offices could be inherited and bought. He obtained his office from his eldest brother, Jean-Jacques, probably against payment. In 1703, he sold the office to his nephew, also called Jean-Antoine, but kept the right to wear the cordon bleu.

His office at the Order of the Holy Spirit allowed him to wear the attributes of the order: the cordon bleu (blue ribbon), the "plaque" (cross to be worn on the breast) and the smaller cross attached to the cordon bleu. The broad blue ribbon and the breast cross are clearly visible on his portrait by Hyacinthe Rigaud.

Judicial career 
Jean-Antoine followed in the steps of his father by starting a career in the judiciary. In 1661, he became Conseiller au Parlement; in 1667, Maître des requêtes; and finally, much later, in 1695, Conseiller d'État ordinaire.

Diplomatic career 
His diplomatic career fell entirely into the reign of Louis XIV, who ruled France from the death of Cardinal Mazarin in 1661 to 1715. He served under three secretaries of state for foreign affairs: first under Simon Arnauld, marquis de Pomponne until 1679, then under Charles Colbert, marquis de Croissy until 1696, and finally under Charles's son Jean-Baptiste Colbert, marquis de Torcy, until the end of Louis XIV's reign. Croissy was a younger brother of the great Colbert.

Ambassador in Venice (1672–1674) 
In 1672 Louis XIV appointed him as his ambassador to the Republic of Venice. From the 15th to the 18th centuries, Venice repeatedly clashed with the Ottoman Empire in seven Ottoman-Venetian Wars, but his embassy fell into a period of peace between the end of the Cretan War (1669) and the beginning of the Morean War (1684). The French had intervened in the Cretan War during the Siege of Candia to gain favour with the pope for the Most Christian King, but the French expeditions ended in disaster, and France pulled out of the war, leading to the fall of Candia. The Venetians felt betrayed, and he needed to rebuilt trust and understanding. He engaged in industrial espionage and facilitated the purchase of Italian works of art for the royal collections. He stayed at the post until 1674.

Peace of Nijmegen 

From 1675 to 1678, he negotiated the treaty that ended the Franco-Dutch War (1672–1678). During the negotiations, he befriended Charles Colbert, marquis de Croissy, a senior French diplomat and brother of Jean-Baptiste Colbert, Minister of Finance from 1661 to 1683. Colbert de Croissy was to become his superior as secretary of state for foreign affairs after the conclusion of the treaties in 1679.

Ambassador at The Hague (1678–1689) 
With the Peace of Nijmegen in 1678, France resumed diplomatic relations with the Dutch Republic, and Jean-Antoine de Mesmes was appointed ambassador at The Hague. He had been preceded by Pomponne before the interruption caused by the Franco-Dutch War. However, in 1683 and 1684, war came again near the DutchnRepublic, as France besieged and took fortresses in the neighbouring Spanish Netherlands during the War of the Reunions. The Dutch did not intervene but felt menaced by the inroads made by the French towards their borders. The war ended with the Truce of Ratisbon, which consisted of several bilateral treaties including a treaty between France and the Dutch Republic as a preparation for the treaty between France and Spain. The French felt that appeasing the Dutch was as important as talking to the Spanish. Jean-Antoine de Mesmes, being ambassador at The Hague, was asked to negotiate the treaty between France and the Dutch Republic. In the treaty, France abandoned Dixmude (Diksmuide) and Courtrai (Kortrijk) but kept Luxembourg. Jean-Antoine de Mesmes signed it "de Mesmes, comte d'Avaux" on 29 June. The treaty between Louis XIV and Charles II of Spain was signed about 1½ months later on 15 August 1685 in Ratisbon (Regensburg), the seat of the German diet, by Louis de Verjus, comte de Crécy, the French ambassador to the diet.

In 1685, Louis XIV revoked the Edict of Nantes, which had guaranteed freedom of religion to French Protestants. The ensuing persecution sent waves of refugees, called the Huguenots, all over Northern Europe. The ambassador in 1686 reportef the presence of 75,000 Huguenots in the Netherlands.

Jean-Antoine de Mesmes soon found out about William of Orange's plans to invade England and warned Louis XIV. On 9 September 1688, he handed over a letter from Louis XIV that threatened the Dutch Republic with war. On 5/15 November 1688 William landed in Brixham. France responded by declaring war on the Dutch Republic on 26 November, thereby breaking the Truce of Ratisbon and starting the Nine Years' War. Diplomatic relations between France and the Dutch Republic again were severed. Jean-Antoine de Mesmes was forced to leave his post in The Hague in 1689, after a stay of more than ten years.

Irish expedition (1689–1690) 

In 1689 he was appointed ambassador extraordinary to James II for the Irish expedition. On 12/22 March 1689 he arrived with James II at Kinsale, on Ireland's southern coast, sailing with the King on the flagship, the Saint Michel. He reported to Louvois, with regard to military aspects but to Colbert de Croissy with regard to foreign affairs. He had been given 300,000 livres for James and a secret fund of 200,000 to spend as he wanted. He sat on James II's council, together with Tyrconnell and Melfort, James's secretary of state. For James and Melfort, Ireland was only a springboard to Scotland and England. Jean-Antoine de Mesmes, in contrary, insisted on the importance of consolidating their grip on Ireland. Whereas James and Melfort wanted to protect the Irish Protestants to keep possible support in Scotland and England, Tyrconnell and Jean-Antoine de Mesmes mistrusted the Protestants and wanted to satisfy the demands of the Irish Catholics for land and rights.

Jean-Antoine de Mesmes was finally dismissed and replaced with the comte Lauzun, who was favoured by James and his queen, Mary of Modena. At the very end of his mission, before embarking to return to France in April 1690, Jean-Antoine de Mesmes explained to his successor that "you are come to be a sacrifice for a poor, spirited and cowardly people whose soldiers will never fight and whose officiers will never obey orders, and therefore they would meet the same fate his Master's [i.e. Louis XIV's] army met with at the Siege of Candia, that is to be wasted and destroyed." He was referring to the disastrous French intervention in favour of the Venetian Republic at the Siege of Candia in 1669.

Ambassador in Stockholm (1692–1699) 
In 1692, the French ambassador to Sweden, Maximilien Alpin de Béthune, died suddenly while he was posted in Stockholm. On 30 November 1692, Louis XIV appointed Jean-Antoine de Mesmes in his place. Sweden enjoyed a period of peace after the Scanian War (1675–1679), which had been mainly fought in southern Sweden. France was allied with Sweden while the Netherlands were allied with Denmark, which made the war a collateral of the Franco-Dutch War of 1672–1678.

When he became ambassador in Sweden, France was fighting England, the Dutch Republic, Spain and the Holy Roman Empire in the Nine Years' War, which was exhausting its finances. King Charles XI of Sweden (ruled 1675–1697) had wisely stayed neutral. France wanted to use Sweden, its former ally, to mediate between France and the Empire in the peace talks. The war eventually ended with the Treaty of Ryswick, concluded in September and November 1697 in the Netherlands. The Swedish diplomat  mediated in the negotiations, and France was represented by Marshal Boufflers.

Colbert de Croissy died in 1696 and was replaced by his son Colbert de Torcy. Charles XI died in April 1697 and was succeeded by the young Charles XII.

Jean-Antoine de Mesmes recruited Beata Elisabet von Königsmarck as an agent for France to create an alliance between Sweden and Denmark through a marriage of Charles XII to Princess Sophia Hedwig of Denmark. The purpose was to prevent a repetition of the alliances in the Franco-Dutch and the Scanian Wars in which Denmark was allied with the Dutch Republic against France and Sweden. However, Charles XII never married. Jean-Antoine de Mesmes stayed in Sweden until summer 1699. In 1700, the Great Northern War broke out in which Denmark, Poland and Russia attacked Sweden.

According to Saint-Simon, the Swedes were disappointed when they discovered that the new French ambassador was only a nobleman of the robe, not of the sword.

Standing in for Briord in the Hague (1701) 
In 1701, Louis XIV sendt Jean-Antoine de Mesmes to the Dutch Republic for the second time, to stand in for Ambassador , who had fallen ill. Maréchal Boufflers occupied the Barrier Fortresses in the night of 5 to 6 February while Jean-Antoine de Mesmes was travelling from Paris to The Hague, where he arrived on 12 February. In April, Briord had recovered and returned to Paris. On 17 April, William recognised Philip V as King of Spain. Jean-Antoine de Mesmes rested until in August. Shortly afterwards, diplomatic relations are broken by the War of the Spanish Succession.

Later years 
In 1688, at his eldest brother's death, Jean-Antoine de Mesmes inherited the seigneury of Roissy. In 1704, at the age of 64, he decided to build himself a country residence at Roissy. He demolished the old manor and began a new chateau, consisting of a central mansion and two lateral pavilions around a courtyard. The château was near completion at his death.

He died in Paris on 10 February 1709 at the age of 69 years. He had never married. He bequeathed the chateau de Roissy to his niece Marie-Thérèse, marquise de Fontenilles, daughter of his eldest brother, Jean-Jacques. The castle was then bought by the marquise de la Carte in 1713 and by John Law in 1719. It was demolished after a fire in 1794. Archaeological excavations have been conducted in 2000.

Notes and references

Notes

Citations

Sources 

  – Knights of the Order of the Holy Spirit and general index
 
  – (Preview)
  – This part of Volume 2 concerns industry and commerce.
 
  – 1692 to 1694
 
 
  – 1680 to 1700
 
 
 
  – ABA to BAR (for Avaux, cited in the older edition where the succession is clearer)

  – M to N
 
  – 1701
  – 1703
  – 1709
  – First series in two volumes

Further reading

External links 
 Racines Histoire

 

1640 births
1709 deaths
17th-century French diplomats